Nguyễn Hữu Phúc (born 20 December 1992) is a Vietnamese footballer who plays as a midfielder for V-League (Vietnam) club Hải Phòng.

Hữu Phúc made his debut for Da Nang on 18 January 2017 when he scored the equalizing goal against his former team Quang Nam in a 1–1 draw.

References 

1992 births
Living people
Vietnamese footballers
Association football midfielders
People from Vĩnh Phúc province
V.League 1 players
Hanoi FC players
Dong Thap FC players
SHB Da Nang FC players
Haiphong FC players